Armando Ibáñez Correa (born 3 April 1973) is a Bolivian football manager and former player who played as a midfielder.

Playing career

Club
Born in Santa Cruz de la Sierra, Ibáñez started his career at hometown side Real Santa Cruz, joining their youth setup at the age of 14. After making his senior debut in 1991, he represented the club until 1997 before moving to The Strongest for the 1998 season.

In 1999, Ibáñez returned to Real Santa Cruz, but played for Guabirá in the 2000 campaign. In 2001 he joined Oriente Petrolero, and moved to cross-town rivals Independiente Petrolero in 2003.

Ibáñez subsequently represented Blooming, Destroyers, La Paz and Aurora before returning to Blooming in 2009. He retired with the latter in 2010, aged 37.

International
Ibáñez made his debut for the Bolivia national team on 31 January 2002, starting in a 0–6 friendly loss against Brazil. He only played in one further match for the full side, a 2–2 draw against Paraguay on 13 February of that year.

Managerial career
Shortly after retiring, Ibáñez started working as a manager, being appointed in charge of 24 de Septiembre. He was subsequently in charge of Real América before returning to his first club Real Santa Cruz in 2018.

Ibáñez left Santa Cruz in June 2019, and was appointed in charge of Mariscal Sucre in September. He started the 2020 campaign at the helm of Torre Fuerte, before returning to Mariscal Sucre in October.

On 14 May 2021, after a period in charge of San Felipe, Ibáñez replaced Carlos Fonseca as manager of Real Potosí.

References

External links

1973 births
Living people
People from Santa Cruz de la Sierra
Bolivian footballers
Association football midfielders
Bolivian Primera División players
Real Santa Cruz players
The Strongest players
Guabirá players
Oriente Petrolero players
Club Independiente Petrolero players
Club Blooming players
Club Destroyers players
La Paz F.C. players
Club Aurora players
Bolivian football managers
Bolivian Primera División managers
Real Santa Cruz managers
Club Real Potosí managers